Omata is a locality in Taranaki, in the western North Island of New Zealand. It is located on State Highway 45 just southwest of New Plymouth. Omata and Western New Plymouth are adjacent to the Tapuae Marine Reserve.

The area was the site of the Omata Stockade, built to house soldiers during tensions at the time of the First Taranaki War in 1860–61, and is near the site of the Battle of Waireka on 28 March 1860. The stockade, designed and constructed by local settlers, was built on the site of Ngāturi Pā. In August 1860, most of Omata village was burnt down during the war. Troops were stationed at the stockade until 1866, and it was demolished by farmers and the remains auctioned off in late 1867.

Demographics

Omata had a population of 939 at the 2018 New Zealand census, an increase of 102 people (12.2%) since the 2013 census, and an increase of 168 people (21.8%) since the 2006 census. There were 330 households, comprising 468 males and 468 females, giving a sex ratio of 1.0 males per female. The median age was 46.3 years (compared with 37.4 years nationally), with 180 people (19.2%) aged under 15 years, 126 (13.4%) aged 15 to 29, 498 (53.0%) aged 30 to 64, and 132 (14.1%) aged 65 or older.

Ethnicities were 94.9% European/Pākehā, 7.7% Māori, 1.0% Pacific peoples, 1.9% Asian, and 1.3% other ethnicities. People may identify with more than one ethnicity.

The percentage of people born overseas was 13.7, compared with 27.1% nationally.

Although some people chose not to answer the census's question about religious affiliation, 55.0% had no religion, 37.7% were Christian, 0.6% had Māori religious beliefs, 0.3% were Buddhist and 0.6% had other religions.

Of those at least 15 years old, 159 (20.9%) people had a bachelor's or higher degree, and 102 (13.4%) people had no formal qualifications. The median income was $39,400, compared with $31,800 nationally. 192 people (25.3%) earned over $70,000 compared to 17.2% nationally. The employment status of those at least 15 was that 408 (53.8%) people were employed full-time, 144 (19.0%) were part-time, and 21 (2.8%) were unemployed.

Education

Omata School is a coeducational full primary (years 1–8) school with a roll of  students as of  In 2003, the school celebrated its 150th jubilee.

Omata electorate

Omata was an electorate for the New Zealand House of Representatives from 1853 to 1870. Seven Members of Parliament represented the electorate in the 1st to 4th Parliament.

References 

Populated places in Taranaki
New Plymouth District